Gettin' High on Your Own Supply is the third studio album by English electronic music group Apollo 440. It was released on 6 September 1999 in the United Kingdom by Stealth Sonic Recordings and Epic Records and in the United States by 550 Music.

Track listing

Video games
 "Stop the Rock" is part of the FIFA 2000 and Gran Turismo 3 A-Spec video game soundtracks.
 "Cold Rock the Mic" was used as a part of the Gran Turismo 2 soundtrack.
 "Yo! Future" is used on the soundtrack for ATV Offroad Fury.
 "Blackbeat" is used on the main intro and Soundtrack for EA Sports F1 2002. An edited version was also used for the intro of ITV's Formula 1 coverage from 2000 to 2002.

References

Apollo 440 albums
1999 albums